The M2351 "Eagle" was a hard disk drive manufactured by Fujitsu with an SMD interface that was used on many servers in the mid-1980s.

The data density, access speed, reliability, use of a standard interface, and price point combined to make it a very popular product used by many system manufacturers, such as Sun Microsystems.  The Eagle was also popular at installations of DEC VAX systems, as third-party storage systems were often dramatically more cost-effective and space-dense than those vendor-supplied.

The model 2351A incorporated eleven platters rotating at 3,960 rpm, taking half a minute to spin up.  The Eagle used  platters, unlike most of its competitors, which still used the  standard set in 1962 by the IBM 1311. One moving head accessed each data surface (20 total), one more head was dedicated to the servo mechanism.  The model 2351AF added 60 fixed heads (20 surfaces × 3 cylinders) for access to a separate area of 1.7 MB.

The Eagle achieved a data transfer rate of 1.8 MB/s (a contemporary  PC disk would only deliver 0.4 MB/s).

Power consumption (of the drive alone) was about 600 watts.

Notes

External links
 
 

Computer storage devices
Fujitsu